Trans Viking Icebreaking & Offshore is an icebreaker shipping company. A joint venture between Viking Supply Ships and Rederi Transatlantic the company operates three icebreakers on contract with the Swedish Maritime Administration for icebreaking in the Baltic Sea from January through March. Commercial management is handled by VSS while Transatlantic is responsible for technical management.

The company was created in 1998 and has also contracted for four anchor handling tug supply vessels for delivery from Astilleros Zamakona during 2009–11. The company is based in Kristiansand, Norway.

Shipping companies of Norway
Companies based in Kristiansand
Transport companies established in 1998
1998 establishments in Norway